Comanthus is a genus of echinoderms belonging to the family Comatulidae.

The species of this genus are found in Indian and Pacific Ocean.

Species:

Comanthus briareus 
Comanthus delicata 
Comanthus gisleni 
Comanthus imbricatus 
Comanthus kumi 
Comanthus novaezealandiae 
Comanthus parvicirrus 
Comanthus scintillus 
Comanthus suavia 
Comanthus taviana 
Comanthus wahlbergii 
Comanthus weberi

References

Comatulidae